Bahia Boussad (born 31 January 1979) is a retired Algerian athlete who competed in racewalking events. She represented her country at the 2000 Summer Olympics, placing last out of all the finishers.

Competition record

External links
 

1979 births
Living people
Algerian female racewalkers
Athletes (track and field) at the 2000 Summer Olympics
Olympic athletes of Algeria
African Games bronze medalists for Algeria
African Games medalists in athletics (track and field)
Athletes (track and field) at the 1999 All-Africa Games
Athletes (track and field) at the 2003 All-Africa Games
Athletes (track and field) at the 2007 All-Africa Games
Athletes (track and field) at the 2005 Mediterranean Games
Mediterranean Games competitors for Algeria
21st-century Algerian women
20th-century Algerian women